Trenholme Bar railway station was a railway station built to serve the hamlet of Trenholme Bar in North Yorkshire, England. Trenholme Bar station was closed in 1954 to passengers and four years later to goods.

The A19 trunk road now runs through part of the station site.

History

The station was opened with the line in 1857 when the North Yorkshire and Cleveland Railway Company built their line between Picton and Stokesley, but just two years later, the line and stations were taken over by the North Eastern Railway (NER). Whilst the station was situated in a hamlet that had a crossing over a main north–south road (later the A19), it was the nearest railway station for Crathorne to the north and Mount Grace Priory to the south.

A late-running train that was not due to stop at Trenholme Bar, left the rails and fell to the south side of the running line. It caused some injuries and two deaths, with the bodies being moved to an inn at nearby Hutton Rudby, where an inquest was opened soon afterwards. The Board of Inquiry found that the engine was a goods engine which was too heavy for the line it was on and it was stated that "...the permanent way was unable to withstand the strain thus put upon it."

Bradshaw's timetable of 1877 shows five out and back workings between Stockton railway station and Whitby, with connections advertised in Middlesbrough. Return services were just five a day with four coming from Whitby. The other service from Whitby reversed at Battersby and went to Stockton via  railway station. By 1946, eight years before closure, the service was down to just three stopping services each way per day, with most of the services from Whitby to Stockton reversing at Battersby and going via Middlesbrough.

The station was furnished with a small goods yard on the south side of the line. It had three sidings, one with a coal depot. The station closed in June 1954. When the A19 road was widened in the 1970s, the dual carriageway took up some of the former station site.

References

External links

Disused railway stations in North Yorkshire
Former North Eastern Railway (UK) stations
Railway stations in Great Britain opened in 1857
Railway stations in Great Britain closed in 1958